The naval Battle of Gibraltar took place on 25 April 1607, during the Eighty Years' War, when a Dutch fleet surprised and engaged a Spanish fleet anchored at the Bay of Gibraltar. During the four hours of action, most of the Spanish ships were destroyed.

Forces 
A Dutch fleet of 26 warships was led by Jacob van Heemskerk. The Dutch flagship was Æolus. Other Dutch ships were De Tijger, De Zeehond, De Griffioen, De Roode Leeuw, De Gouden Leeuw, De Zwarte Beer, De Witte Beer, and De Ochtendster.

A Spanish fleet of 21 ships, including 10 galleons, was led by Don Juan Álvarez de Avilés. The Spanish flagship San Augustin was commanded by Don Juan's son. Other ships were Nuestra Señora de la Vega and Madre de Dios. The Spanish fleet was covered by a fortress, although the Dutch fleet was out of range of its guns at all times and they could not intervene in the battle.

Battle 

Van Heemskerk left some of his ships at the bay entrance to prevent the escape of any Spanish ships. Twenty from the Dutch fleet were ordered to focus on the Spanish galleons while the rest attacked the smaller vessels. Van Heemskerk was killed during the first approach on the Spanish flagship as a cannonball severed his leg. The Dutch then doubled up on the galleons and a few of the galleons caught fire. One exploded due to a shot that penetrated its powder magazine. The Dutch captured the Spanish flagship but let it go adrift.

Following the destruction of the Spanish ships, the Dutch deployed boats and killed hundreds of swimming Spanish sailors. The Dutch lost 100 men including Admiral Van Heemskerk. Sixty Dutch were wounded. Depending on the sources, most or all of the Spanish ships were lost and between 350 and 4,000 Spaniards were killed or captured. Álvarez de Avilés was amongst the dead.

The battle resulted in a 12-year truce in which the Dutch Republic achieved de facto recognition by the Spanish Crown.

The battle had an important indirect effect on the History of Ireland, specifically the key event known as "Flight of the Earls". Hugh O'Neill, 2nd Earl of Tyrone, and Rory O'Donnell, 1st Earl of Tyrconnell, left Ulster in Ireland with the intention of getting a Spanish army to invade Ireland on their behalf. The destruction of the Spanish fleet ruled out any such option, and the Earls found themselves in irrevocable exile - with major consequences for the later history or Ireland, and especially of Ulster.

Gallery

Footnotes

Sources

External links 
 

1607 in Europe
17th century in Gibraltar
Conflicts in 1607
Eighty Years' War (1566–1609)
Military history of Gibraltar
Naval battles involving the Dutch Republic
Naval battles of the Eighty Years' War